The 2003 Shell Turbo Chargers season was the 19th season of the franchise in the Philippine Basketball Association (PBA).

Draft picks

Occurrences
During halftime of Shell's second game of the season against Purefoods, the Turbo Chargers retire the number 14 jersey of their franchise player Benjie Paras, who owns the distinction of being the only rookie-MVP in PBA history.

Returning import Sedric Webber could only play four games in the Reinforced Conference where Shell scored two victories, he fractured his right ankle and watched helplessly on the sidelines when the Turbo Chargers absorbed their third setback against Talk 'N Text. Former Houston Rocket Tim Breaux replaces Webber in their next game against Barangay Ginebra in Calape, Bohol and he played only one game after Shell lost to the Gin Kings. Jamal Kendrick, a veteran of the Lebanon league, plane in for Shell's next game against San Miguel on October 1.

Roster

Game results

All-Filipino Cup

References

Shell Turbo Chargers seasons
Shell